Werner Hinz (18 January 1903 – 10 February 1985) was a German film actor. He appeared in 70 films between 1935 and 1984.

Selected filmography

 The Old and the Young King (1935) - Kronprinz Friedrich ('Fritz')
 White Slaves (1937) - Boris - Diener beim Gouverneur
 The Citadel of Warsaw (1937) - Konrad
  (1938) - Kaplan von Schigorski
 Der vierte kommt nicht (1939) - Kapitän Holm
 The Fox of Glenarvon (1940) - Sir Tetbury
  (194) - Ronny
 Bismarck (1940) - Kronprinz Friedrich
 My Life for Ireland (1941) - Michael O'Brien sen
 Ohm Krüger (1941) - Jan Krüger
 Destiny (1942) - Kosta Wasileff
 Die Entlassung (1942) - Kaiser Wilhelm II.
 Melody of a Great City (1943) - Dr. Rolf Bergmann, Berichterstatter
 Wild Bird (1943) - Professor Losse
 The Heart Must Be Silent (1944) - Freiherr von Bonin
 Meine Herren Söhne (1945) - Kurt Redwitz, Gutsbesitzer
 Der Fall Molander (1945) - Holk, Prosecutor
 In Those Days (1947) - Steffen / 1. Geschichte
 Martina (1949) - Professor Rauscher
 Girls in Gingham (1949) - Paul Schmiedecke
 The Appeal to Conscience (1945/1949) - Volkmar Hollberg, Schrifsteller
 The Beaver Coat (1949) - Friedrich von Wehrhahn
 The Guilt of Doctor Homma (1951) - Dr. Magnus Homma
 No Greater Love (1952) - Basil Zaharoff
 Confession Under Four Eyes (1954) - Jorga
 Fireworks (1954) - Albert
 The Last Summer (1954) - Der Innenminister
 Beloved Enemy (1955) - Gerald Gore, englisher Konsul
 The Plot to Assassinate Hitler (1955) - Generaloberst Ludwig Beck
 Hotel Adlon (1955) - Lorenz Adlon
 You Can No Longer Remain Silent (1955) - Samuelsen
 Nina (1956) - Oberst Kapulowski
  (1957) - Carl Zeiss
 Confessions of Felix Krull (1957) - Stabsarzt
 Heart Without Mercy (1958) - Friedrich Rombach
 The Girl from the Marsh Croft (1958) - Vater Erlandsson
 Restless Night (1958) - Oberleutnant Ernst
 The Blue Moth (1959) - Steve Owens
 The Black Chapel (1959) - Generaloberst
 The Buddenbrooks (1959) - Jean Buddenbrook
 The Last Witness (1960) - Landgerichtsrat Ricker
  (1961) - Dr. Maurer
 Verdammt die jungen Sünder nicht (1961) - Oskar Jüttner
 The Liar (1961) - Sperber
 The Longest Day (1962) - Field Marshal Erwin Rommel
 Tonio Kröger (1964) - Consul Kröger
 Praetorius (1965) - Violettas Vater
 Rheinsberg (1967) - Claire's Father
 Morning's at Seven (1968) - Grandfather
 When Sweet Moonlight Is Sleeping in the Hills (1969) - Grandfather
 Derrick - (Season 4, Episode 06: "Das Kuckucksei") (1977) - Vater Horre
 The Rider on the White Horse (1978) - Amtmann aus Husum

References

External links

1903 births
1985 deaths
20th-century German male actors
German male film actors
Male actors from Berlin
Ernst Busch Academy of Dramatic Arts alumni
Commanders Crosses of the Order of Merit of the Federal Republic of Germany